Mehmet I of Karaman, also known as Şemseddin Mehmet, was the second bey of Karaman Beylik, a Turkish principality in Anatolia in the 13th century. His father was Karaman Bey.

Life
After the death of his father around 1261, Mehmet collaborated with the governor of Niğde to start a rebellion against the Mongols who were the suzerain of Seljuk lands. However, after the governor of Niğde was killed by the Mongols, Mehmet lost his capital Ermenek. Nevertheless, Mehmet continued fighting, and in 1276 he defeated the combined forces of Mongols and Seljuks in a surprise attack in the Göksu River valley.

Next year he allied himself with Baybars of Mamluks. In May he captured Konya, the Seljuk capital. But instead of declaring himself as the sultan he supported his puppet Jimri as sultan, and in turn Jimri appointed him as vizier of the Seljuks on 12 May 1277. As vizier Mehmet issued his famous firman (decree) ordering the Turkish language to be used instead of Persian and Arabic in government offices. But his service term in Konya lasted only about a month. Hearing news of the approaching Mongol army, both Mehmet and Jimri fled from Konya. But the Mongols chased him, and during a clash in Mut Mehmet and his two sons were executed in August 1277.
He was succeeded by his brother Güneri.

Firman
Mehmet is known as a devotee of the Turkish language. During his brief term as a vizier, he issued a firman dated 13 May 1277:

|
Şimden girü hiç kimesne kapuda ve divanda ve mecalis ve seyranda Türki dilinden gayri dil söylemeye.
|
From now on nobody in the palace, in the divan, council and on walks speak no language other than Turkish.

Legacy
The university of Karaman city is named after him.(see Karamanoğlu Mehmetbey University)

See also
 Firman of Karamanoğlu Mehmet Bey

References

Karamanids
1277 deaths
Year of birth unknown
Turkic rulers
13th-century monarchs in the Middle East
Ethnic Afshar people